The Silk Road Fund is a state-owned investment fund of the Chinese government to foster increased investment in countries along the One Belt, One Road, an economic development initiative primarily covering Eurasia. The Chinese government pledged US$40 billion for the creation of the investment fund established on 29 December 2014.

Personnel
The senior executives are all from four shareholders and officials from People's Bank of China have taken most of the posts as the biggest holder, State Administration of Foreign Exchange, is a subordinate body of the Central Bank. For instance, the chairman of board of directors, Jin Qi, was formerly the assistant governor of the People's Bank of China. And the most important executive post, General Manager, was assigned to Wang Yanzhi, the Director of Foreign Exchange Reserves to Entrust Loan Office of State Administration of Foreign Exchange.

The structures of board of directors and supervisors represent the balance of power between OBOR related institutions. In the board of directors, four relevant ministries of Central Government, including Ministry of Foreign Affairs, National Development and Reform Commission, Ministry of Finance and Ministry of Commerce, and four shareholders respectively send one midlevel official to delegate in the board. In the board of supervisors, with Yang Zejun, former Secretary-general of the Office of the Central Financial Leadership Group, acting as chairman, senior executives from CIC, CDB and IEBC share the seats with two other staff representatives.

Stakeholders
Unlike other funds, whose organizational forms are mainly limited partnership, private equity (PE) in particular, Silk Road Fund is a limited liability company. Its 4 shareholders are: State Administration of Foreign Exchange (65%), China Investment Corporation (15%), Export-Import Bank of China (15%) and China Development Bank (5%). The Fund has a total capital of 40 billion, and the first round of capital installment is US$10 billion, contributed by the shareholders accordingly.

Connections with People's Bank of China
Silk Road Fund is semi-directly under the supervision of People's Bank of China. Its Party Organizational Relations are under the management of PBOC. For instance, on 18 January 2016, the Governor of PBOC, Zhou Xiaochuan participated in the Meeting of Democratic Life with the Party Committee of Silk Road Fund and gave instructions on Fund operation and Party building after the management team reported the work and their criticism and self-criticism. In the Chinese political system, participation in Meeting of Democratic Life means supervision and superiority.

Investments
Until August 2017, the committed investment of Silk Road Fund is US$6 billion and equity investment accounts for nearly 80%, according to the chairman JIN Qi, and the number of its invested projects was 15 by May 2017.
  Part of the initial fund was invested in the construction of a Mombasa–Nairobi Standard Gauge Railway.
  US$1.65-billion investment in the Karot Hydropower Project and other hydropower projects in the region as part of the China-Pakistan Economic Corridor
  Acquisition of 9.9% of Yamal LNG project, a liquefied natural gas project in Sabetta, located north-east of the Yamal Peninsula, from Novatek
  Dubai Hassyan Clean Coal Powerplant, co-invested with Harbin Electric International of China
  24% equity stake in 4th phase of the Mohammed bin Rashid Al Maktoum Solar Park, which is the largest single-site investment project that combines CSP and photovoltaic technology using the IPP model.
  Acquisition of 9.9% of PJSC SIBUR Holdings, a giant energy company of Russia.

See also
General Electric

References

Belt and Road Initiative
Private equity firms of China